Wojciech Fortuna (born 6 August 1952) is a Polish former ski jumper who won the Olympic Gold Medal in the Large Hill at the 1972 Winter Olympics in Sapporo. In the Normal Hill he finished 6th. The Gold Medal was Poland's first - and the only gold until Vancouver 2010 - in the Winter Olympics history. Four time participant of the Four Hills Tournament, with his best ranking was during the XXI edition, achieving 18th place.

He competed from 1969 to 1979.

References

External links
 

1952 births
Living people
Polish male ski jumpers
Olympic ski jumpers of Poland
Ski jumpers at the 1972 Winter Olympics
Ski jumpers at the 1976 Winter Olympics
Olympic gold medalists for Poland
Sportspeople from Zakopane
Olympic medalists in ski jumping
Recipients of the Gold Cross of Merit (Poland)
Knights of the Order of Polonia Restituta
Medalists at the 1972 Winter Olympics